The 1939–40 Primeira Divisão season was the sixth season of top-tier football in Portugal. The season was marked by a controversy regarding the teams qualified from Porto FA Regional Championship.

Due to an administrative battle between FC Porto and Académico do Porto regarding a Regional Championship game that ended with only 43 minutes after the start and later repeated (which FC Porto won) according to a Porto FA decision, the Portuguese Federation came out with a decision to satisfy both clubs, expanding Primeira Divisão to 10 teams (one more from Porto FA and another from Setúbal FA) and annulling the result from the repetition match. With this decision, FC Porto lost the Regional title and finished third; Leixões SC became the new regional champion, ahead second-placed Académico. All three teams qualified for the 1939–40 Primeira Divisão.

Overview

It was contested by 10 teams, and F.C. Porto won the championship.

League standings

Results

References

Sources

Primeira Liga seasons
1939–40 in Portuguese football
Portugal